The Louisiana Tech University Athletic Hall of Fame was established in 1984 to honor student-athletes, coaches, administrators, and benefactors who have been highly successful at Louisiana Tech and who have distinguished themselves professionally. To be eligible for induction into the Louisiana Tech Athletic Hall of Fame, an athlete must have completed his or her college eligibility at least five years prior to the selection, and coaches and administrators must have completed their careers at Louisiana Tech at least three years before induction.

Inductees

References

External links

College sports halls of fame in the United States
Halls of fame in Louisiana
Hall Of Fame
Tourist attractions in Lincoln Parish, Louisiana
Awards established in 1984